Ekambaranathar Temple, Tiruvekambathur, is a Siva temple in Tiruvekambathur in Ramnad District in Tamil Nadu (India). It is also known as Tiruvekambattu and Tiruvekambam.

Vaippu Sthalam
It is one of the shrines of the Vaippu Sthalams sung by Tamil Saivite Nayanar Appar.

Presiding deity
The presiding deity is known as Ekambaranathar . His consort is known as Snehavalli.

Shrines
Shrines Vinayaka, Subramania, Navagraha, Bairava and Chandra are found.  In the kosta, Dakshinamurthy, Lingodbhava and Brahma are found.

References

External links
 மூவர் தேவார வைப்புத்தலங்கள், eAkampathu, Sl.No.50 of 139 temples

Hindu temples in Ramanathapuram district